The 2005 European Short Track Speed Skating Championships took place between 14 and 16 January 2005 in Turin, Italy.

Medal summary

Medal table

Men's events

Women's events

Participating nations

See also
Short track speed skating
European Short Track Speed Skating Championships

External links
Detailed results
Results overview

European Short Track Speed Skating Championships
European Short Track Speed Skating Championships
European
International speed skating competitions hosted by Italy
Sports competitions in Turin
European Short Track Speed Skating Championships
2000s in Turin